The following radio stations broadcast on AM frequency 1320 kHz: The U.S. Federal Communications Commission and the Canadian Radio-television and Telecommunications Commission classify 1320 kHz as a regional broadcast frequency.

In Argentina
 Area 1 in Caseros
 LU10 in Azul, Buenos Aires
 LV24 Andina in Tunuyán, Mendoza

In Canada

In Mexico
XENM-AM in Aguascalientes, Aguascalientes
 XEARZ-AM in Mexico City
 XENET-AM in Mexico City

In the United States

References

Lists of radio stations by frequency